Who Killed Mary What's 'Er Name? (also known as Death of a Hooker) is a 1971 film directed by Ernest Pintoff and starring comedian and actor Red Buttons and featuring Sylvia Miles, Conrad Bain, Alice Playten and Sam Waterston. Gary McFarland wrote the soundtrack music.

The film was rated PG despite the fact that it dealt with topics including prostitution and murder.

Since its original theatrical release, the film was released only on VHS (distributed by Video Gems in 1982), and is now out of print.

Plot
The plot centers around the murder of a prostitute in a crime-ridden low-income city neighborhood. Dismayed by the general indifference the police and neighbors show toward the murder, a resident who knew the prostitute sets out to do his own investigation of the case.

Cast
Red Buttons as Mickey Isador 
Sylvia Miles as Christine 
Alice Playten as Della Isador 
Conrad Bain as Val Rooney 
Dick Anthony Williams as Malthus 
Sam Waterston as Alex Monte 
David Doyle as Roger Boulting
Gilbert Lewis as Solomon the Cop
Earl Hindman as Whitey 
Ron Carey as Larry the Bartender

See also
List of films featuring diabetes

References

External links
 
 

1971 films
1971 crime films
1970s mystery films
Films directed by Ernest Pintoff
Golan-Globus films
1970s English-language films